The year 1882 in science and technology involved some significant events, listed below.

Astronomy
 September – Great Comet of 1882 sighted.
 December 6 – Transit of Venus, 1882.

Biology
 March 24 – Robert Koch announces his discovery of the bacterium responsible for tuberculosis, Mycobacterium tuberculosis.
 Élie Metchnikoff discovers phagocytosis.

Chemistry
 Italian physicist Luigi Palmieri detects helium on Earth for the first time through its D3 spectral line when he analyzes the lava of Mount Vesuvius.

Earth sciences
 Clarence Dutton's Tertiary History of the Grand Cañon District is published by the United States Geological Survey.

Mathematics
 June – German mathematician Ferdinand von Lindemann publishes proof that  is a transcendental number and that squaring the circle is consequently impossible.
 December – Swedish mathematician Gösta Mittag-Leffler establishes the journal Acta Mathematica.
 Felix Klein first describes the Klein bottle.

Medicine
 March 28 – Paul Beiersdorf patents an adhesive bandage in Germany, the foundation of the Beiersdorf company.
 Vladimir Bekhterev publishes Provodiashchie puti mozga ("The Conduction Paths in the Brain and Spinal Cord"), beginning to note the role of the hippocampus in memory.

Technology
 January 12 – Holborn Viaduct power station in the City of London, the world's first coal-fired public electricity generating station, begins operation.
 By March – Étienne-Jules Marey invents a chronophotographic gun capable of photographing 12 consecutive frames per second on the same plate.
 April 29 – Werner von Siemens demonstrates his Electromote, the first form of trolleybus, in Berlin.
 June 6 – Henry W. Seeley patents the electric clothes iron in the United States.
 September 4 – Thomas Edison starts the United States' first commercial electrical power plant, lighting one square mile of lower Manhattan.
 English mechanical engineer James Atkinson invents his "Differential Engine".
 American electrical engineer Schuyler Wheeler produces an electric fan.
 Alfred P. Southwick publishes his proposals for use of the electric chair as an execution method in the United States.

Events
 First International Polar Year, an international scientific program, begins.
 The Chartered Institute of Patent Agents, the modern-day Chartered Institute of Patent Attorneys, is founded in the United Kingdom.

Awards
 Copley Medal: Arthur Cayley
 Wollaston Medal for Geology: Franz Ritter von Hauer

Births
 March 14 – Wacław Sierpiński (died 1969), Polish mathematician.
 March 23 – Emmy Noether (died 1935), German mathematician.
 March 30 – Melanie Klein (died 1960), Viennese-born psychoanalyst.
 April 27 – Harry Allan (died 1957), New Zealand botanist.
 June 17 – Harold Gillies (died 1960), New Zealand-born plastic surgeon.
 July 12 – Traian Lalescu (died 1929), Romanian mathematician.
 July 21 – Herbert E. Ives (died 1953), American optical engineer.
 September 30 – Hans Geiger (died 1945), German inventor of the Geiger counter.
 October 5 – Robert Goddard (died 1945), American rocket scientist.
 October 26 – Marietta Pallis (died 1963), Indian-born Graeco-British ecologist.
 November 18 – Frances Gertrude McGill (died 1959), pioneering Canadian forensic pathologist.
 December 11 – Max Born (died 1970), German physicist and recipient of the Nobel Prize in physics in 1954.
 December 28 – Arthur Eddington (died 1944), English astrophysicist.
 Israel Aharoni (died 1946), Belarusian-born Jewish zoologist.

Deaths
 January 11 – Theodor Schwann (born 1810), German physiologist.
 April 19 – Charles Darwin (born 1809), English naturalist and geologist.
 August 24 – John Dillwyn Llewelyn (born 1810), Welsh botanist and photographer.
 September 23 – Friedrich Wöhler (born 1800), German chemist.
 October 27 – Christian Heinrich von Nagel (born 1803), German geometer.
 November 20 – Henry Draper (born 1837), doctor, American astronomer.
 December 24
 Johann Benedict Listing (born 1808), German mathematician.
 Charles Vincent Walker (born 1812), English telegraph engineer.

References

 
19th century in science
1880s in science